The Battle of Lahore was fought between the Durrani Empire and the Maratha Empire, who were assisted by the forces of the local Sikh Misls such as the Sukerchakia Misl and the Ahluwalia Misl of the Punjab in 1759.

Background and battle
Ahmad Shah Durrani raided India for the fifth time in 1759. The Pashtuns began to organize themselves for armed struggle against the Marathas. The Pashtuns had no time to pass information to Kabul for help. General Jahan Khan advanced and captured a Maratha garrison at Peshawar. Then, the invaders overran Attock. Meanwhile, Sabaji Shinde retreated and reached Lahore with fresh troops and a large number of Sikh army of the Sukerchakia and Ahluwalia Misls. In the fierce battle, the Afghans were defeated by the combined forces of the Marathas and the Sukerchakia and Ahluwalia Misls. In the battle, Jahan Khan lost his son and was himself also wounded.

References

Battles involving the Maratha Empire
Battles involving the Sikh Confederacy
Battles involving Afghanistan
Conflicts in 1759
1759 in India
Military history of Lahore